Events from the year 1741 in Russia

Incumbents 
 Emperor – Ivan VI (until 6 December)
 Regent – Sovereign and Grand Duchess Anna Leopoldovna (until 6 December)
 Empress – Elizabeth (since 6 December)

Events

  
 
  
  
 
 8 August – Sweden declared war on Russia as the response to the murder of the Swedish diplomatic courier Malcolm Sinclair.
 6 December – Elizabeth of Russia becomes empress after a palace coup.

Births

 
 
 
 15 July - Catherine Antonovna of Brunswick, younger sister of emperor Ivan VI.
 Ivan Gudovich, military commander

Deaths

 19 December - Vitus Bering, explorer of the Far East and the Pacific.

References

1741 in Russia
Years of the 18th century in the Russian Empire